WHSM-FM (101.1 MHz, "Muskie 101") is a radio station licensed to serve Hayward, Wisconsin, United States.  The station is owned by Zoe Communications, Inc.

WHSM-FM broadcasts a country music format, with 100% local programming 24 hours a day, its studios and transmitter are located at 16880 W. Highway 63, west of downtown Hayward.

The station was assigned the WHSM-FM call sign by the Federal Communications Commission on July 11, 1980.

References

External links

WHSM activates HD Radio

HSM-FM
Country radio stations in the United States
Radio stations established in 1980
Sawyer County, Wisconsin